The 2012 Triple J Hottest 100 was announced on Australia Day 26 January 2013. It was the 20th countdown of the most popular songs of the year, as chosen by the listeners of Australian radio station Triple J.

Voting commenced on 19 December 2012, and closed at midnight on 20 January 2013.

Over 1.5 million votes were cast in this countdown, beating the record set in the 2011 list.

In the week prior to the countdown, Nick Drewe, a Brisbane statistician and marketer, analysed the votes that had been published on social media and determined the possible top 100, naming it the Warmest 100. The votes that had been published represented approximately 2.7% of the total vote. Ultimately, his list correctly predicted 92 of the songs in the countdown, the songs comprising the top 10, and the top 3 in the correct order. The ABC have announced that it would likely make changes to the voting system to prevent "spoiler attempts" in future countdowns.

Full list

Artists with multiple entries

Four tracks
 Flume (three times solo and one remix; 4, 12, 18, 67)

Three tracks
 alt-J (3, 64, 81)
 Frank Ocean (8, 56, 80)

Two tracks
 Macklemore and Ryan Lewis (1, 15)
 Of Monsters and Men (2, 47)
 Tame Impala (7, 9)
 Mumford & Sons (5, 58)
 The Rubens (10, 66)
 Florence Welch (once with Florence & the Machine and once with Calvin Harris; 11, 32)
 Calvin Harris (11, remixed 32)
 The Black Keys (13, 79)
 Rudimental featuring John Newman (16, 20)
 Ball Park Music (23, 27)
 Seth Sentry (26, 57)
 Lana Del Rey (34, 86)
 Two Door Cinema Club (37, 90)
 Grimes (38, 65)
 Chance Waters (45, 89)
 San Cisco (48, 53)
 The Presets (52, 70)
 Jack White (60, 97)

Countries represented
 Australia – 41
 United States – 29
 United Kingdom – 23
 Canada – 4
 Sweden – 4
 Iceland – 2
 New Zealand – 1
 France – 1
 Italy – 1
 Faroe Islands – 1

Top 10 Albums of 2012
A smaller poll of Triple J listeners' favourite albums of the year was held in December 2012.

Bold indicates  J Award winner.

Notes

 For the second year in a row, the songs "Lonely Boy" and "Brother" charted in the countdown. This time "Lonely Boy" was covered by Matt Corby, who ranked at #3 (with his song "Brother") behind the original song by The Black Keys in the previous year's Hottest 100 (at #2). The version of "Brother" that appears in this year's countdown is a cover by Thundamentals.
 There were eight songs in a row by Australian artists between positions 55 and 48. This is the equal longest run of Australian songs since 1999.
 For the fourth consecutive year, an artist from Triple J Unearthed made it into the Top 10 of the countdown. Flume ranked at #4 this year.
 "Thrift Shop" is the first hip-hop song to top the chart in Hottest 100 history. It also breaks the record of highest ranking hip-hop song, which was previously set by Hilltop Hoods who managed to place third in both 2006 and 2009.
 "My Heart Is on Fire" by Asta marks the first appearance in the countdown by the winning entry in Unearthed High. 2011 winners Snakadaktal charted in the previous countdown with a song they had recorded after winning the competition.
 For the first time since 2008, no Australian artist featured in the Top 3.
 The four highest charting artists in this year's countdown were all debutants. This is the first time this has happened since the first countdown in 1993.
 Additionally, the four highest charting artists in this year's countdown were acts from four nations. This is the first time in the poll's history this has occurred.
 78 artists made in into the chart; this makes this list the second most diverse list.
 For the second year in a row, Calvin Harris placed at #11.

CD release
The Triple J Hottest 100 CD for 2012 is the twentieth edition of the CD series. It was released on 22 February 2013.

References

External links

Warmest 100
The Top 100 most played songs on Triple J for 2012
US economist confirms the Warmest 100 findings
Unofficial Hottest 100 Database

2012 in Australian music
Australia Triple J
2012 in music
2012